Play Safe is a 1927 American silent comedy film directed by Joseph Henabery and starring Monty Banks. An abridged two-reel version was shown in the United States as Chasing Choo Choos.

Plot
A gang of bad guys menace a man's girlfriend. She hides in a freight car and a misstep sends the otherwise-empty train out of the station with the lever pushed to full speed. As the train gains speed, the captive's boyfriend must transfer to the runaway train from a car racing alongside, repel the pursuing gang, get his girl out of the boxcar, and somehow get the two of them to safety. An oncoming locomotive, a water tower, a steep grade, a frayed rope and a broken plank between cars complicate the hero's task.

Cast
Monty Banks as Monty
Virginia Lee Corbin as Virginia Craig
Charles Hill Mailes as Silas Scott
Charles K. Gerrard as Scott's son
Bud Jamison as Big Bill
Max Asher
Fatty Alexander
Rosa Gore 
Syd Crossley

Preservation status
Prints in 35mm and 16mm exist.

References

External links

Play Safe at SilentEra
Lobby poster

1927 films
American silent feature films
1927 comedy films
Silent American comedy films
Films directed by Joseph Henabery
American black-and-white films
Pathé Exchange films
1920s American films